KDOM may refer to:
 KDOM-FM, an FM radio station in Windom, Minnesota, United States
 KDOM (AM), an AM radio station in Windom, Minnesota, United States
 KDOM (module), a KDE rendering module
 The Kosovo Diplomatic Observer Mission